The Hands of Cormac Joyce is a 1972 made-for-television movie (Hallmark Hall of Fame) directed by Fielder Cook.

Plot
A proud fisherman off the Irish Coast fights to save his land from an approaching storm as other villagers evacuate to the mainland.

Cast
 Stephen Boyd as Cormac Joyce
 Colleen Dewhurst as Molly Joyce
 Dominic Guard as Jackie Joyce
 Deryck Barnes as Pat Coneeley
 Cyril Cusack as Mr. Reece
 Enid Lorimer as Mrs. Reece
 Lynette Floyd as Elis Coneeley
 Marshall Crosby as Tigue Coneeley

Production
The film was a U.S.-Australian co-production. It was shot in Australia with Phillip Island substituting for Aran Island. Many of the crew had worked on the TV show Homicide, but some of them had to be replaced during the shoot as it was realised they did not have the experience to make a 35mm film shot on location.

References

External links

Australian drama television films
1972 television films
1972 films
1970s English-language films
Films directed by Fielder Cook